Ljiljana Habjanović Đurović is a Serbian writer.

Literary career
Habjanović Đurović's biography indicates that she was born in Kruševac, in what was then the People's Republic of Serbia in the Federal People's Republic of Yugoslavia. She received her elementary and high school education in the city and later graduated from the University of Belgrade Faculty of Economics. She worked as a bank clerk, a commercialist in the field of foreign tourism, and a journalist for Duga before devoting herself to a full-time literary career in 1996. She is the owner of the publishing house Globosino Aleksandrija, which she founded in 2003.

She has published fourteen novels, many of which have been best-sellers in Serbia. Her recognitions include the prestigious Zlatni beočug award (2008) and the award Vukova nagrada (2009), the latter of which she received for her contributions to Serbian culture. She has also been recognized by the Serbian Orthodox Church for the role of spirituality in her literature.

Habjanović Đurović's works have also gained a following in other countries. She received the Zlatni Vitez (Golden Knight) literary award in Russia in 2011, and she has received significant recognition in Italy. The 2016 Italian language translation of her work Ana Maria Did Not Love Me received a favourable review that was published via the Agenzia Nazionale Stampa Associata wire service; among other things, this piece commended Habjanović Đurović's depictions of strong female characters throughout her works.

Habjanović Đurović defended the response of various Muslim organizations in Serbia to the publication of Sherry Jones's The Jewel of Medina in August 2008. Jones's book was widely criticized by Muslim groups internationally for its depiction of Muhammad's wife Aisha; in Serbia, Muslim community leaders requested and received an apology from the book's publisher. The community leaders added that they had no interest in banning literature but simply wished to draw attention to the desecration of their faith that they identified in the book. Some Serbian literary figures, including Aleksandar Čotrić, described this response as "excessive." Habjanović Đurović disagreed, saying, "An author that writes about true actions and events has a responsibility to travel and investigate these events' historical background. This is especially important when one writes about the heritage of a nation that one does not belong to. [...] When I was writing An Observation of the Soul, in the segment where I wrote about Skanderbeg, I had to study Albanian history of the fifteenth century."

Engagement with politics
Habjanović Đurović was identified in a 1997 Washington Post article as a close friend of Mirjana Marković, the wife of Slobodan Milošević. In 1994, she wrote an article in the Serbian media describing the initial meeting of Milošević and Marković at high school in Požarevac, as Marković was reading Sophocles's Antigone. In Habjanović Đurović's account, Marković's sorrow from the early death of her mother attracted her to Milošević, as he "felt the need to relieve her pain, to protect and cherish her." A May 1999 New York Times article, which described Habjanović Đurović as Marković's "hagiographer," also cited her as having written that Marković "always openly and boldly claimed that [Milošević] would have been quite different without her, worse in every respect, and that everything good about him came from her and that everything that is not good is where her influence didn't reach."

In February 2008, shortly after the government of Kosovo's unilateral declaration of independence, she wrote an article for the paper Večernje novosti with the title, "Kosovo's non-oblivion: Occupation will pass." This work included the statement, "[N]o official of the state of Serbia must ever accept the secession of part of our country. Or succumb to delusions based on promises. Or get scared by threats. Each and every one of us must keep awareness inside us and pass it onto our descendants - that Kosovo-Metohija is a Serb land and that this which has happened is occupation that will end, just like any other occupation."

Habjanović Đurović was herself elected to the National Assembly of Serbia in the 2016 parliamentary election; she was included in the ninth position on the Serbian Progressive Party's Aleksandar Vučić — Future We Believe In electoral list as a non-partisan candidate and was awarded a mandate when the seat won a majority victory with 131 out of 250 seats. She declined her mandate, saying that she was grateful to have contributed to Vučić's victory but wanted to devote her full attentions to writing. The website of the National Assembly considers her to have served as a deputy on 3 June 2016, after the new assembly met and before her resignation took effect.

Published works
Her novels include:

Јавна птица (Public Bird) (1988)
Ана Марија ме није волела (Ana Maria Did Not Love Me) (1991)
Ива (Iva) (1994)
Женски родослов (Feminine Genealogy) (1996)
Пауново перо (The Peacock Feather) (1999)
Петкана (Petkana) (2001)
Игра анђела (The Dance of Angels) (2003)
Свих жалосних радост (The Joy of All the Sorrowful) (2005)
Запис душе (An Observation of the Soul) (2007)
Вода из камена (Water From Stone) (2009)
Сјај у оку звезде (Radiant Gleam in the Eye of the Star) (2012)
Наш отац (Our Father) (2014)
Гора Преображења (2015)
Онда је дошла Добра Вила (2016)

She also wrote a book on publishing entitled Србија пред огледалом (Serbia in Front of a Mirror) (1994), and in 2017 she released three stories for children. Habjanović Đurović has also published anthologies of devotional poetry.

References

1953 births
Living people
Writers from Kruševac
Writers from Belgrade
Serbian novelists
Serbian women novelists
Members of the National Assembly (Serbia)